Algés may refer to:

 Algés (Oeiras), a parish in Oeiras, Portugal
 Algés River, a river in Algés Parish, Portugal
 U.D.R. Algés, a football club that plays in Algés Parish